Paralepidotus is an extinct genus of prehistoric ray-finned fish.

Distribution
 
Fossils of  Paralepidotus  are found in the Triassic marine strata of Austria, France, Italy, Poland, Saudi Arabia and United States.

See also

 Prehistoric fish
 List of prehistoric bony fish

References 

 Paleobiology Database

Prehistoric ray-finned fish genera
Marine fish genera
Triassic fish of Asia
Triassic fish of Europe
Triassic bony fish